The Air21 Express first participated in the Philippine Basketball Association (PBA) draft as the Shopinas.com Clickers on August 28, 2011, one month before their first PBA season. The Clickers bought the original franchise of the Barako Bull Energy Boosters in 2011 when Barako Bull filed for leave of absence after the 2010-11 PBA Philippine Cup and eventually disbanded after the season ended. Shopinas.com received the rights for all of the Barako Bull's players and draftees. As an incentive of being a new franchise, the PBA Board of Governors gave Shopinas.com the 11th overall pick (first in the second round).

Mark Barocca became the team's first draft choice, the 5th pick in the 2011 PBA Draft. Barocca was later traded to the B-Meg Llamados, just two days after he was drafted.

The team was renamed as the Air21 Express after the 2011-12 PBA Philippine Cup.

Selections

Notes
1.All players entering the draft are Filipinos until proven otherwise.

References

Philippine Basketball Association draft